Boy with a Pipe may refer to the following paintings:

 Garçon à la pipe by Picasso (tobacco pipe)
 Shepherd with a Flute by Titian or Giorgione, Royal Collection (musical pipe)